Aglossa tenebrosalis is a species of snout moth in the genus Aglossa. It was described by Walter Rothschild in 1915, and is known from Algeria.

References

Moths described in 1915
Pyralini
Endemic fauna of Algeria
Moths of Africa